Ambrož is a given name and surname in Czech and Slovene derived from Ambrosius. Equivalent spellings in other languages are listed under See also.

People
 Ambrož Hradecký (died 1439), Czech priest, preacher, and political leader
 Berta Ambrož (1944–2003), Yugoslav Slovene singer
 Jan Ambrož (born 1954), Czech chess master
 Mihael Ambrož (1808–1864), Slovenian politician

Places
 Ambrož pod Krvavcem, a village in Slovenia on the border with the Czech Republic

See also 
Equivalent given and surnames in other languages include:
 Ambrose (disambiguation), English
 Ambros, German
 Ambroš (disambiguation), Croatian
 Ambrus (disambiguation), Hungarian
 Ambrogio, Italian
 Ambroży, Polish
 Amvrosy, Russian
 Ambroz (disambiguation), Serbo-Croatian
 Ambróz (disambiguation), Slovakian
 Ambrosio (disambiguation), Spanish

Slavic-language surnames